Quri Punchu (Quechua quri gold, punchu poncho, "gold poncho", also spelled Ccoripunchu) or is a mountain in the Andes of Peru, about  high. It is situated in the Ayacucho Region, Lucanas Province, Puquio District. Quri Punchu lies southeast of two larger lakes named Apiñaqucha and Pukaqucha.

References 

Mountains of Peru
Mountains of Ayacucho Region